The 1965 West Virginia Mountaineers football team represented West Virginia University as a member of the Southern Conference (SoCon) during the 1965 NCAA University Division football season. Led by Gene Corum in his sixth and final season as head coach, the Mountaineers compiled an overall record of 6–4 with a mark of 4–0 in conference play, winning the SoCon title for the second consecutive season.

Schedule

References

West Virginia
West Virginia Mountaineers football seasons
Southern Conference football champion seasons
West Virginia Mountaineers football